The Williams was an electoral district of the Legislative Assembly in the Australian state of New South Wales, created in 1859 in the northern part of the Hunter Region and named after the Williams River. In 1880, it was replaced by Durham and Gloucester.

Members for Williams

Election results

References

Former electoral districts of New South Wales
Constituencies established in 1859
1859 establishments in Australia
Constituencies disestablished in 1880
1880 disestablishments in Australia